Kenny Noyes (born 18 June 1979) is an American motorcycle road racer. His parents Dennis and Heidi Noyes are both American, but lived in Spain for over 20 years where Dennis raced winning the Spanish Endurance Championship and the Motociclismo Series twice.

Born in Barcelona, Spain, Noyes began dirt-track racing in the US, winning the national championship before returning to Spain to begin road racing. In 2003 he became Spanish Superstock Champion, and won the Endurance title 2 years later. His first CEV 1000cc Extreme National podium came in 2008, and he challenged for the title in 2009.

Noyes made his international racing debut in the new Moto2 series in 2010. He was competitive immediately, briefly leading at Jerez. and starting from pole at Le Mans, however he was less competitive in the next three races. Finished championship in 24th position (of 30).

Noyes raced for 2012 in the Spanish CEV Moto2 championship for PL Racing Moto2 aboard a Suter finishing 3rd overall with four podiums. Noyes signed for the LaGlisse team (renamed Team Calvo) for the 2013 season, staying in CEV Moto2 once again aboard a Suter.

Career statistics

By Seasons

By class

Races by year
(key) (Races in bold indicate pole position)

References

External links

 

Living people
American expatriate sportspeople in Spain
American motorcycle racers
Moto2 World Championship riders
Sportspeople from Barcelona
1979 births
Supersport World Championship riders